Maislinger is a surname. Notable people with the surname include:

Adolf Maislinger (1903–1985), well-known prisoner of the Dachau concentration camp
Andreas Maislinger (born 1955), Austrian historian, political scientist, and founder of the Austrian Holocaust Memorial Service
Johanna Maislinger (born 1985), Austrian aviator and engineer